"The Pioneers" is a song by Bloc Party from their debut album, Silent Alarm (2005). It was released in the United Kingdom by Wichita Recordings on 18 July 2005 and reached number 18 in the UK Singles Chart. On some editions of the album it was called "Pioneers". Each copy of the single is numbered in the top left corner.

Music video
The music video was made by the company Mini Vegas and was directed by Aoife McArdle.

Track listings
CD: Wichita / WEBB088SCD (UK)
 "The Pioneers"
 "Plans" (Acoustic)
 "Storm and Stress" (Acoustic)

7-inch: Wichita / WEBB088S (UK)
 "The Pioneers"
 "The Pioneers" (Bloc Party vs The Mystery Jets)

DVD: Wichita / WEBB088DVD (UK)
 "The Pioneers"
 "Banquet" (Original Video)

Charts

References

2005 singles
2005 songs
Bloc Party songs
Song recordings produced by Paul Epworth
Songs written by Gordon Moakes
Songs written by Kele Okereke
Songs written by Matt Tong
Songs written by Russell Lissack
Wichita Recordings singles